Sonorarctia is a genus of tiger moths in the family Erebidae.

Species
Sonorarctia fervida (Walker, 1855)
Sonorarctia nundar (Dyar, 1907)

References

Natural History Museum Lepidoptera generic names catalog

Arctiina
Moth genera